6th of October is a city in Giza Governorate, a satellite town and part of the urban area of Cairo, Egypt, 32 km (20 miles) outside the city. It has a population ranging between some 185,000 in the city to an estimated 500,000 inhabitants in the wider area.

6th of October was the capital of the now defunct 6th of October Governorate. A new city in the desert, it hosts Egyptian students and students from various countries, such as the Persian Gulf, Jordan, Nigeria, Cameroon, Syria, Iraq, and the Palestinian territories, who study at its private universities.

History
The settlement was established in 1979 by the 504th presidential decree of Egyptian President Anwar El Sadat. It is 32 km (20 mi) from the center of Cairo and 17 km (11 mi) from the great pyramids of Giza. Despite having many unfinished or vacant buildings, the city has a total area of 482 km2 (119,200 acres) and is eventually expected to have 6 million residents.

It was announced as the capital of the 6th of October Governorate in April 2008. Following the governorate's dissolution in April 2011, in the wake of the Egyptian revolution, it was reincorporated into the Giza Governorate, to which it had originally belonged.

The city's name commemorates the commencement of the 1973 Arab–Israeli War on October 6, 1973, the same date chosen as Egypt's Armed Forces Day.

Climate
Köppen-Geiger climate classification system classifies its climate as hot desert (BWh). Its climate is very similar to Giza and Cairo, owing to its proximity to them. thats being said, some places in 6th of October is a bit colder and windier than central Cairo and Giza(city) at night for several reasons. mainly its the fact that building as infrastructure being more spaced out accompanied by more empty spaces allows for wind to pick for easily than the densely populated centre of Giza and Cairo. Also the city was built in the desert which tends to be colder and dryer than the damp humid area more closer to the nile.

Headquarters

6th of October is the headquarters of the Confederation of African Football. It hosts Egypt's Smart Village, the technology park and regional hub for many companies in the IT and financial sectors.

Business
6th of October City has one of the largest industrial zones in Egypt, on which the entire city was established. The industrial zone provides jobs for employees within the city as well as from other parts of Giza. It is accompanied by a banking sector that groups branches of all banks in Egypt in an area that is close to the industrial area to serve the needs of the industry and residents.

Some of the largest businesses in 6th of October City are mentioned below:
 Bavarian Auto Group
 Egyptian German Automotive Company
 General Motors Egypt
 Shaer Consult Consultant Engineers
 Seoudi Group
 Stream Global Services
 Vodafone Egypt

Industry
6th of October Airport is used for the transport of products and materials to and from the city. The city also houses four industrial zones.

Important factories:
 IGA Egyptian-German Car Factory
 Suzuki Egypt
 Juhayna Food Industries
 Daewoo Motors Egypt
 Style Team Lighting
 Franke Kitchen Systems Egypt
 Pepsico Egypt
 Aller Aqua Factory

Education facilities

There are seven private universities in 6th of October City, including two private medical schools at Misr University for Science and Technology and October 6 University.

Universities and Institutes

 Ahram Canadian University (ACU)
 Akhbar El Youm Academy
 Cairo University (CU) in Sheikh Zayed City
 Culture & Science City
 Egyptian Aviation Academy (EAA)
 Higher Institute of Applied Arts
 Higher Institute for Architecture
 Higher Institute of Engineering
 Higher Institute of Science and Technology
 Higher Technological Institute
Pyramids Higher Institute for Engineering and Technology
 Misr University for Science and Technology (MUST)
 Modern Sciences and Arts University (MSA)
 Nile University (NU)
 New Giza University (NGU)
 October 6 University (O6U)
 Zewail City of Science and Technology
 Arab Academy for Science, Technology & Maritime Transport
Information Technology Institute

Secondary schools and international schools

 American International School in Egypt West Campus - Sheikh Zayed City
 Beverly Hills Schools
 British International School in Cairo
 International School of Choueifat 6th of October City
 Heritage International School
 6th of October Stem school
City Language School
Hossary-Azhari Language School

Health services
 Dar Al Fouad Hospital, the first accredited cardiac hospital in Africa and the Middle East
 Misr University for Science and Technology (Souad Kafafi Memorial) Hospital
 October 6 University Teaching Hospital

Religion

Islam

The city is served by many mosques, the largest being El Hosary Mosque on El Tahrir St. built in the honour of an eminent Egyptian Qari, Mahmoud Khalil Al-Hussary.

Christianity

There are several churches in 6th of October city. The most famous of them is Redeem Christian Church of God(RCCG).

Tourism and hotels

Hotels
 Hilton Pyramids Golf
 Mövenpick Hotel & Casino Cairo - Media City
 Novotel Hotel
 Helnan Dreamland Hotel & Conference Center
 Swiss Inn Pyramids Golf Resort & Swiss Inn Plaza

See also
 Sheikh Zayed City
 Smart Village Egypt
 Greater Cairo
 Haram City
 New Borg El Arab
 10th of Ramadan (city)
 List of cities and towns in Egypt

References

 
Districts of Greater Cairo
Populated places in Giza Governorate
Populated places established in 1979
1979 establishments in Egypt
Cities in Egypt
New towns started in the 1970s
New towns in Egypt